Esau Jenkins (July 3, 1910 – October 30, 1972) was a South Carolina African-American Human Rights leader, businessman, local preacher, and community organizer. He was the founder and leader of many organizations and institutions which helped improved the political, educational, housing, health and economic conditions of Sea Island residents.

Life and career 

Jenkins grew up during the times of segregation, when educational opportunities were not readily available to him.  However, he knew the importance of education and was determined that his children and those of others would not be denied.  In the 1940s, Esau and his wife Janie used their money from farming and selling produce to purchase several buses. These buses were used to transport their own children and others on the Sea Islands to school in Charleston and thus further their education. In 1951, he was instrumental in the establishment of Haut Gap High School on Johns Island, so all children on the island would have the educational opportunity to better themselves.  Today, Haut Gap is an advance studies magnet middle school.

Jenkins’ buses also transported workers to jobs in the Charleston area.  During the bus rides, Jenkins and his wife would teach their adult passengers the information needed to pass the literacy exam, so they could become registered voters.  Jenkins realized the need for a systemic approach to adult education. At the invitation of Septima Clark, he traveled to Highlander Folk Center to meet with Myles Horton to discuss the need for adult education and citizen classes on the Sea Islands.  The first citizenship school was established on Johns Island at the Progressive Club (listed in 2007 on the National Register of Historic Places ).  The Progressive Club was a co-op started in 1948 by Jenkins and other families on Johns Island.  Notable individuals participated in workshops including Dr. Martin Luther King Jr. and many others.  The co-op housed a community grocery store, gas station, recreation area, sleeping rooms, classroom space and allowed residents to trade goods and services to help each other in times of need. The school was so effective that it served as the model for other citizenship schools established throughout the South to teach adult education, basic literacy and political education classes and workshops, resulting in thousands of citizens becoming registered voters.

Jenkins founded the Citizens Committee of Charleston in 1959 and the C.O. Federal Credit Union in 1966.  This credit union helped to further the economic advancement of the community.  Residents were able to secure low-interest loans to purchase homes, businesses, vehicles and even send their children to college.

Jenkins was also one of the founders of Rural Mission, Inc.  This initiative provided services for migrant and seasonal farm workers on the Sea Islands.  In or about 1970, Rural Mission, Inc. received $96,000.00 through the Office of Economic Opportunity with the assistance of Senator Ernest F. Hollings to start a health clinic at Bethlehem United Methodist Church to serve the five sea islands of Charleston County:  Johns Island, James Island, Wadmalaw Island, Edisto Island, and Yonges Island.  In February 1972, the health clinic became a separate incorporated entity and was known as Sea Island Comprehensive Health Care Corporation,  a comprehensive health care center for the Sea Island residents.

Jenkins and his wife owned and operated a fruit and vegetable stand, a fleet of buses, a motel and restaurant in Charleston, SC and also on Atlantic Beach, SC.

Mr. Jenkins was known for his iconic 1966 Volkswagen deluxe station wagon (also known as a VW Bus) that he  used for his work in the community and throughout the South.  Printed on the back panels of the vehicle was Jenkins' motto:   “Love is Progress, Hate is Expensive.”   In 2014, the Jenkins family donated the back panels of the vehicle to the new  Smithsonian National Museum of African American History and Culture to become a part of one of the permanent exhibits entitled “Defining Freedom, Defending Freedom: The Era of Segregation”.

The Smithsonian, the Jenkins family, and the Preservation Society of Charleston hosted the bus artifacts send off to the Smithsonian on June 1, 2014.  This event was included in the Piccolo Spoleto Festival and several hundred attended.  All local Charleston news outlets covered the story via interviews and articles about the event.

The Historic Vehicle Association and the College of Charleston's Historic Preservation and Community Planning BA Program were instrumental in preserving the Volkswagen bus, and in September 2019, the bus was the 26th vehicle added to the National Historic Vehicle Register.

Jenkins died on October 30, 1972.  He has received many posthumous awards, including having a bridge, street, and health clinic named in his memory.

References

Notes

External links

 Esau Jenkins Papers at the  Avery Research Center for African American History and Culture at the College of Charleston
 Progressive Club, http://www.postandcourier.com/article/20160214/pc1002/160219625
 Sea Island Comprehensive Health Care Corporation (www.sichcc.org) 
 Community Owned Federal Credit Union (http://www.cofederalcreditunion.com/)
 May 10, 1962 New York Amsterdam News article by Dr. King introduces two unknown heroes of the Civil Rights Movement in the South, People in Action: Unknown Heroes
 http://www.thekingcenter.org/archive/theme/447
 "Faith in Action: The First Citizenship School on Johns Island, South C" by Amanda Shrader Jordan - Digital Commons @ East Tennessee State University - ETSU.edu
 AT&T South Carolina African American History Calendar,  http://scafricanamerican.com/honorees/esau-jenkins/
 Civil Rights Digital Library, http://crdl.usg.edu/people/j/jenkins_esau_1910_1972/?Welcome
 Esau Jenkins Memorial Bridge,http://www.postandcourier.com/article/20150321/PC1201/150329895  
 
 Esau Jenkins van send off event, 2014 Piccolo Spoleto Program Guide - Piccolo Spoleto Festival
 Credit Union National Association News, http://news.cuna.org/articles/SC_CU,_civil_rights_leader_receives_Smithsonian_honor
 United Methodist Church, View pdf - United Methodist Church
 Progressive Club, https://www.ncba.coop/ncba-media/press-releases/432-the-co-op-that-changed-the-south
 http://www.ithaca.com/news/local_news/civil-rights-activist-dorothy-cotton-speaks-about-the-movement-world/article_4462acb4-654b-59c5-b4dd-b42e30194556.html
 Digital Collections in SC - Digital Collections - LibGuides at South Carolina State Library
 Local Civil Rights pioneer's van sent to Smithsonian  News, Weather, Sports, Breaking News  ...
 Photo of Esau Jenkins at the podium at Emmanuel AME Church, Dr. King seated behind, http://www.aikenstandard.com/article/20160117/AIK0101/160119464
 https://www.loc.gov/folklife/civilrights/survey/view_collection.php?coll_id=2615
 Huffington Post, 11 Baby Names Inspired By Civil Rights Activists

Activists for African-American civil rights
1910 births
1972 deaths
20th-century American educators
African-American writers
American writers
20th-century African-American educators